I0 (the letter "I" followed by the digit "0", zero) may refer to:
 Axiom I0: There is a nontrivial elementary embedding of  into itself with critical point below λ. This is a strong large cardinal axiom of set theory of rank-into-rank type.

I-0 may refer to :
 I-0 (video game), a piece of interactive fiction written by Adam Cadre

See also
IO (disambiguation) (the letter "I" followed by the letter "O")
10 (disambiguation) (the digit "1" followed by the digit "0")
1O (disambiguation) (the digit "1" followed by the letter "O")